Nashwān ibn Saʻīd al-Ḥimyarī was a Yemeni theologian, judge, philologist, poet and historian.

Life

He was a member of a nobel Yemeni family from Uawt near Sanaa. He is said to have some Mu'tazili views. He wrote a Qur'an commentary and compiled several works on theological, philological, historical and other topics. He died in 1178 C.E

Books
 Shams al-'ulum wa-dawa' kalam al-'Arab min al- kulum (The sun of Wisdom and Remedy for the Arabic Language's Lesions).             
 al-Tabsirah fi al-Deen lilmubsireen, fi al-Rad ala al-ḍalamt al-munkreen.
 Kitāb at-Tibyān. (Quran commentary book)

See also
 Abu Muhammad al-Hasan al-Hamdani

References

Date of birth unknown
1178 deaths
12th-century Arabs
People from Sanaa
Yemeni Muslims
Yemeni historians
Yemeni poets